Timeless is the ninth studio album by the classical crossover group Il Divo. It was released on 10 August 2018 by Decca Gold. The album is Il Divo's first with Universal Music. The album's first single, "Hola" (a Spanish-language version of "Hello" by Adele), was released on 11 May 2018.

Track listing

Charts

References 

Il Divo albums
2018 albums
Spanish-language albums